Alpha Kappa Kappa is a medical school fraternity that was founded on September 29, 1888, at Dartmouth Medical School.

History 
AKK operated as a national organization that had over 60 chapters at various medical schools throughout the United States for approximately 80 years, with national headquarters in Ellettsville, Indiana and possibly in Illinois.  As a professor, Charles H. Mayo became a member of the Minnesota chapter.

The fraternity was a former member of the Professional Fraternity Association.

The fraternity disbanded nationally in the 1960s, with several chapters continuing as independent organizations.

Symbolism and traditions
Around it are twin coiled serpents facing each other. The horns of the crescent support a book bearing the letter(s) of the chapter. In the infobox, a photographic example shows a pin from Mu chapter at the University of Pennsylvania. The book may be set in pearls and emeralds. The name of the school was sometimes etched onto the side of the book, which was held at a diagonal.

The colors of the fraternity were Dartmouth Green and White, to honor the founding school.

The magazine, published quarterly, was The Centaur.

Chapter List
Roll of chapters, ordered alphabetically. In the early days, chapters chose their letters, so in a few cases, date order doesn't match alphabetization. 

  1 Alpha. Medical Department, Dartmouth College, Hanover, N. H.  Founded September 29, 1888. 
  2 Beta. College of Physicians and Surgeons, San Francisco, Cal. Instituted May 19, 1899. 
  3 Gamma. Tufts College Medical School, Boston, Mass. Instituted December 12, 1893. 
  4 Delta. Medical Department, University of Vermont, Burlington, Vt. Instituted May 2, 1894. 
  5 Epsilon. Jefferson Medical College, Philadelphia, Pa. Instituted January 6, 1900. 
  6 Zeta. Long Island College Hospital Medical School, Brooklyn, N. Y. Instituted March 21, 1896. 
  7 Eta. College of Physicians and Surgeons of Chicago. College of Medicine of the University of Illinois, Chicago, Illinois. Instituted December 7, 1899. 
  8 Theta. Maine Medical School, Bowdoin College, Brunswick, Maine. Instituted June 1, 1897. 
  9 Iota. Medical Department University of Syracuse, Syracuse, N. Y. Instituted December 11, 1899.
 10 Kappa. Medical Department, Marquette University, Milwaukee, Wis. Instituted November 15, 1900. 
 11 Lambda. Medical Department, Cornell University, New York City. Instituted March 7, 1901. 
 12 Mu. Medical Department, University of Pennsylvania, Philadelphia, Pa. Instituted March 30, 1901. 
 13 Nu. Rush Medical College, in affiliation with the University of Chicago, Chicago, Ill. Instituted April 27, 1901. 
 14 Xi. Medical Department, Northwestern University, Chicago, Ill. Instituted May 29, 1901. 
 15 Omicron. Miami Medical College (consolidated with and adopted name of Medical Department of University of Cincinnati), Cincinnati, Ohio. Instituted October 28, 1901. 
 16 Pi. Ohio Medical University (As of '07 Starling-Ohio Medical University), Columbus, Ohio. Instituted October 2, 1902. 
 17 Rho. Denver and Gross Medical College, Denver, Colo. Instituted January 6, 1903. 
 18 Sigma. Medical Department, University of California, San Francisco, Cal. Instituted December 6, 1899. 
 19 Tau. University of the South, Sewanee, Tenn. Instituted July 15, 1903. 
 20 Upsilon. Medical Department, University of Oregon, Portland, Ore. Instituted March 21, 1903. 
 21 Phi. Medical Department, University of Nashville, Nashville, Tenn. Instituted March 24, 1903. 
 22 Chi. Medical Department, Vanderbilt University, Nashville, Tenn. Instituted March 24, 1903. 
 23 Psi. Medical Department, University of Minnesota, Minneapolis, Minn. Instituted February 25, 1898. 
 24 Omega. Medical Department, University of Tennessee, Nashville, Tenn. Instituted March 24, 1903. 
 25 Alpha Beta. Medical Department, Tulane University, New Orleans, La. Instituted November 24, 1903. 
 26 Alpha Gamma. Medical Department, University of Georgia, Augusta, Ga. Instituted January 25, 1904. 
 27 Alpha Delta. Medical Department, McGill University, Montreal, P. Q. Instituted November 24, 1904. 
 28 Alpha Epsilon. Medical Department, University of Toronto, Toronto, Can. Instituted April 6, 1905. 
 29 Alpha Zeta. Medical Department, George Washington University, Washington, D. C. Instituted April 27, 1905. 
 30 Alpha Eta. Yale Medical School, New Haven, Conn. Instituted January 31, 1906. 
 31 Alpha Theta. Medical Department, University of Texas. Galveston, Texas. Instituted April 20, 1906. 
 32 Alpha Iota. University of Michigan, Department of Medicine and Surgery, Ann Arbor, Mich. Instituted June 4, 1906. 
 33 Alpha Kappa. University College of Medicine, Richmond, Va. Instituted November 12, 1906. 
 34 Alpha Lambda. Medical College of the State of South Carolina, Charleston, S. C. Instituted January 4, 1908. 
 35 Alpha Mu. St. Louis University School of Medicine, St. Louis, Mo. Instituted March 27, 1909.
 36 Alpha Nu. Louisville. Instituted June 5, 1909.
 37 Alpha Xi. Case Western Reserve. Instituted November 16, 1909.
 38 Alpha Omicron. Kansas City Medical. Instituted April 15, 1911. 
 39 Alpha Pi. Pitt. Instituted April 28, 1911.
 40 Alpha Rho. Harvard Medical. Instituted May 27, 1912.
 41 Alpha Sigma. USC. Instituted April 15, 1913.
 42 Alpha Tau. Emory. Instituted April 24, 1914.
 43 Alpha Upsilon. Johns Hopkins. Instituted March 2, 1917.
 43 Alpha Phi. Missouri. Instituted March 21, 1917.
 45 Alpha Chi. Oklahoma. Instituted October 1, 1920.
 46 Alpha Psi. Iowa. Instituted 1921.
 47 Beta Gamma. Nebraska. Instituted 1921.
 48 Beta Delta. Virginia. Instituted January 20, 1922.
 49 Beta Epsilon. Boston. Instituted 1922.
 50 Beta Zeta. Wisconsin, Madison. Instituted June 20, 1922.
 51 Beta Eta. Maryland. Instituted 1923.
 53 Beta Theta. Washington (MO). Instituted 1923.
 52 Beta Iota. North Carolina. Instituted 1923.
 54 Beta Kappa. Western Ontario. Instituted April 15, 1924.
 55 Beta Lambda. Columbia. Instituted 1925.
 56 Beta Mu. Georgetown. Instituted 1928.
 57 Beta Nu. Duke. Instituted October 24, 1931.
 58 Beta Xi. Stanford. Instituted 1932.
 59 Beta Omicron. Temple. Instituted May 7, 1932. 
 60 Beta Pi. Louisiana State University. Instituted 1934.
 61 Beta Rho. New York Medical. Instituted 1937.
 62 Beta Sigma. Mississippi. Instituted May 17, 1947.
 63 Beta Tau. Washington. Instituted 1947.
 64 Beta Upsilon. Baylor. Instituted January 17, 1948.
 65 Beta Phi. Hahnemann Medical. Instituted May 15, 1948.
 66 Beta Chi. Miami (FL). Instituted 1953.

Continuing chapters or local activity
Note, chapter names didn't follow a strict alphabetical naming order.

Psi Chapter, Minnesota  - now dormant, was chartered in 1897, when its predecessor local, the Alpha Rho Society petitioned for membership into Alpha Kappa Kappa. After dissolution of the national fraternity this chapter was closed. Its real estate assets were sold and a foundation was established, forming a perpetual fund to award scholarships through the Minnesota Medical Foundation. The first such scholarship was awarded in 1984.

Epsilon Chapter, Jefferson Medical (Philadelphia) – Chartered on January 6, 1900, at Jefferson Medical College by Clarence Keeler, Fielding Lewis, George Wrick, and Harry Tuckert. This chapter is still active today with eleven current members, and over 500 living alumni.  The address for the Epsilon chapter is 317 South Eleventh Street, Philadelphia, PA 19107. The chapter currently serves as a reasonably priced housing option for men at Jefferson Medical College.

Alpha Theta Chapter, Texas – Chartered in 1906. Current house built in 1966. This chapter was active in the social scene at the University of Texas Medical Branch until the mid-2000s. It currently provides affordable housing and meal plans for both male and female medical students and residents. 

Alpha Psi Chapter, Iowa  – Chartered in 1921.  Current house purchased in 1925 on the west side of the river.  This chapter was very active, even after the national organization disbanded in the 1960s, Alpha Psi continued to operate independently.  Until the 1970s they had a live-in house mother and cook, then in the 1990s they lost their house cook.  Currently they serve as a reasonably priced housing option for approximately 24 co-ed members of the various professional schools at the University of Iowa.

Other professional medical fraternities
In addition to the medical fraternities listed here, there are numerous chiropractic, pre-health, pharmacy and nursing fraternities.
 Alpha Delta Theta, medical technology
 Alpha Gamma Kappa
 Alpha Phi Sigma, see Phi Delta Epsilon 
 Alpha Tau Sigma, Osteopathic, dormant
 Mu Sigma Phi, Philippines
 Nu Sigma Nu
 Omega Tau Sigma, veterinary medicine
 Omega Upsilon Phi, see Phi Beta Pi
 Phi Alpha Gamma, formerly Homeopathic, see Phi Chi
 Phi Beta Pi
 Phi Chi
 Phi Delta Epsilon
 Phi Kappa Mu, Philippines
 Phi Lambda Kappa
 Phi Rho Sigma
 Sigma Mu Delta, pre-medical
 Theta Kappa Psi

References

Professional medical fraternities and sororities in the United States
Student organizations established in 1888
Former members of Professional Fraternity Association
1888 establishments in New Hampshire